"Tribunaux rustiques" is a short story by French author Guy de Maupassant, published in 1884.

History
It was first published in the newspaper Gil Blas on November 25, 1884, and signed under the name "Maufrigneuse". In 1885 it was reprised in the Monsieur Parent collection.

Synopsis
In the chamber of the justice of the peace of Gorgeville, which is full of peasants, a judge hears the grievances of Madame Victoire Bascule against Isidore Paturon...

Publications
 Gil Blas, 1884
 Monsieur Parent - collection published in 1885 by the editor Paul Ollendorff
 Maupassant, contes et nouvelles, volume II, text established and annotated by Louis Forestier, Bibliothèque de la Pléiade, Éditions Gallimard, 1979

References

External links
 

Short stories by Guy de Maupassant
1884 short stories
Works originally published in Gil Blas (periodical)